Antonio Nava Cid (born 9 September 1999) is a Mexican professional footballer who plays as an attacking midfielder for Dorados.

Career

Club career
On 21 July 2020, Dorados de Sinaloa confirmed the signing of Nava.

References

External links
 
 
 

Living people
1999 births
Club Tijuana footballers
Querétaro F.C. footballers
Dorados de Sinaloa footballers
Liga MX players
Footballers from the State of Mexico
Association football midfielders
Mexican footballers